{{DISPLAYTITLE:C9H9N}}
The molecular formula C9H9N (molar mass: 131.17 g/mol) may refer to:
 1-Methylindole
 2-Methylindole, or methylketol
Skatole, or 3-Methylindole
 5-Methylindole
 7-Methylindole

Molecular formulas